Brézina is a district in El Bayadh Province, Algeria. It was named after its capital, Brézina, which occupies the vast majority of the territory of this district.

Municipalities
The district is further divided into 3 municipalities:
Brézina
Ghassoul
Krakda

Districts of El Bayadh Province